The Japan Act of Specified Commercial Transactions (特定商取引法) aims to protect consumers from harm and to ensure fairness in commercial transactions. It is described and explained in a publication by the Japan Consumer Affairs Agency (JCAA). Door-to-door sales have been prone to conflicts between consumers and companies. It includes regulations on the act of soliciting.

Notes

References 

 Consumer Affairs Agency, Understanding the Act of Specified Commercial Transactions (Japanese) 消費者庁 (2016). 平成28年版　特定商取引に関する法律の解説. Japan: 商事法務. 

Consumer protection legislation